Leucodynerus is a Nearctic genus of small sized potter wasps distributed in south western United States and northern Mexico.

References

 Bohart, R. M. 1942. An analysis of the Odynerus congressus group of the subgenus Leptochilus (Hymenoptera, Vespidae). The Pan-Pacific Entomologist 18: 145–154.
 Bohart, R. M. 1982. Leucodynerus, a new genus of solitary wasps from western North America (Hymenoptera: Sphecidae [correctly Eumenidae]). Journal of the Kansas Entomological Society 55: 442–446.

Fauna of the Southwestern United States
Hymenoptera genera
Insects of Mexico
Insects of the United States
Potter wasps